Ovechkino is a rural locality (a selo) and the administrative center of Ovechkinsky Selsoviet, Zavyalovsky District, Altai Krai, Russia. The population was 618 as of 2013. There are 11 streets.

Geography 
Ovechkino is located 29 km northeast of Zavyalovo (the district's administrative centre) by road. Ovechkino (station) is the nearest rural locality.

References 

Rural localities in Zavyalovsky District, Altai Krai